Field Marshal George Townshend, 1st Marquess Townshend, PC (28 February 172414 September 1807), known as The Viscount Townshend from 1764 to 1787, was a British soldier and politician. After serving at the Battle of Dettingen during the War of the Austrian Succession and the Battle of Culloden during the Jacobite Rising, Townshend took command of the British forces for the closing stages of the Battle of the Plains of Abraham during the Seven Years' War. He went on to be Lord Lieutenant of Ireland or Viceroy where he introduced measures aimed at increasing the size of Irish regiments, reducing corruption in Ireland and improving the Irish economy. In cooperation with Prime Minister North in London, he solidified governmental control over Ireland. He also served as Master-General of the Ordnance, first in the North Ministry and then in the Fox–North Coalition.

Military career

Early years

Born the son of Charles Townshend, 3rd Viscount Townshend, and Audrey Etheldreda Townshend (born Harrison), Townshend was educated at Eton College and St John's College, Cambridge. He joined the army as a volunteer in Summer 1743 and first saw action at the Battle of Dettingen in June 1743 during the War of the Austrian Succession. He became a captain in the 7th Regiment of Dragoons in April 1745 and saw action in the Netherlands. He fought at the Battle of Culloden in April 1746 during the Jacobite Rising, and having been appointed an aide-de-Camp to the Duke of Cumberland and having transferred to the 20th Regiment of Foot in February 1747, he took part in the Battle of Lauffeld in July 1747 during the later stages of the War of the Austrian Succession.

While serving in Belgium, Townshend was elected Member of Parliament for Norfolk unopposed in 1747. He became a captain in the 1st Regiment of Foot Guards and lieutenant colonel in the Army on 25 February 1748. In 1751 he wrote a pamphlet which was deeply critical of Cumberland's military skills. Meanwhile, he argued in parliament that courts martial rather than commanding officers should be responsible for discipline in the Army, pressed for a larger militia and smaller standing army and was personally responsible for ensuring that the Militia Act of 1757 reached the statute book. Promoted to the rank of colonel on 6 May 1758, he became colonel of the 64th Regiment of Foot in June 1759.

Seven Years' War
Townshend was given command of a brigade in Quebec under General James Wolfe; when the latter died on 13 September 1759, and his second-in-command (Robert Monckton) was wounded, Townshend took command of the British forces during Battle of the Plains of Abraham. He received Quebec City's surrender on 18 September 1759. However, he held General Wolfe in much contempt (drawing Wolfe in caricature he created Canada's first cartoon), and was harshly criticized upon his return to Great Britain for that reason (Wolfe was a popular hero throughout the country). Nevertheless, he became colonel of the 28th Regiment of Foot in October 1759, was promoted to major general on 6 March 1761 and fought at the Battle of Villinghausen in July 1761. In May 1762 he took command of a division of the Anglo-Portuguese army, with the local rank of lieutenant-general, to protect Portugal during the Spanish invasion of Portugal.

Post-war

Townshend became Lieutenant-General of the Ordnance in the Grenville Ministry in March 1763 and succeeded his father as Viscount Townshend in March 1764.

Viceroy of Ireland
He went on to be Lord Lieutenant of Ireland in the Chatham Ministry in August 1767 and introduced measures aimed at increasing the size of Irish regiments, reducing corruption in Ireland and improving the Irish economy. After the Parliament of Ireland rejected his money bill, Townshend prorogued parliament in November 1767, making himself very unpopular in Dublin. Most important, he collaborated with Prime Minister Lord North in London in solidified governmental control over Ireland.

Later life
Promoted to the substantive rank of lieutenant general on 30 April 1770, he was replaced as Lord Lieutenant of Ireland in September 1772.

Townshend returned to office as Master-General of the Ordnance in the North Ministry in October 1772. In the aftermath of his unpopular tour in Ireland, he found himself fighting a duel with Charles Coote, 1st Earl of Bellomont, an Irish Peer, on 2 February 1773, badly wounding the Earl with a bullet in the groin. Townshend became colonel of the 2nd Dragoon Guards in July 1773.

In 1779 Richard Edwards, Governor of Newfoundland and Labrador, began work on Fort Townshend, a fortification in Newfoundland and Labrador, naming it after Lord Townshend. Townshend stood down as Master-General of the Ordnance in March 1782 when the Marquess of Rockingham came to power but, having been promoted to full general on 26 November 1782, was restored to the post of Master-General of the Ordnance in the Fox–North Coalition in April 1783. He retired from that office when William Pitt the Younger came to power in January 1784.

Created Marquess Townshend on 27 October 1787, Townshend became Lord Lieutenant of Norfolk in February 1792. He also became Governor of Kingston-upon-Hull in 1794 and Governor of the Royal Hospital Chelsea in July 1795. A peculiar tragedy befell Townshend in May 1796: his son, Lord Charles, had just been elected MP for Great Yarmouth, and he took a carriage to London with his brother, the Rev. Lord Frederick, the Rector of Stiffkey. During the journey, Lord Frederick inexplicably killed his brother with a pistol shot to the head and was ultimately adjudged insane. Promoted to field marshal on 30 July 1796, Townshend died at his family home, Raynham Hall in Norfolk on 14 September 1807 and was buried in the family vault there.

Family
On 19 December 1751, Townshend married Charlotte Compton, 16th Baroness Ferrers of Chartley (d. 1770), daughter of James Compton, 5th Earl of Northampton. They had eight children:

 George Townshend, 2nd Marquess Townshend (1755–1811), Earl of Leicester since 1784 (created by George III) 
 Lord John Townshend (19 January 175725 February 1833)
 Lady Elizabeth Townshend (died 21 March 1811)
 The Rev. Lord Frederick Patrick Townshend (30 December 176718 January 1836)
 Lord Charles Townshend (176827 May 1796)
 Lady Charlotte (1757-16 December 1757)
 Lady Caroline
 Lady Frances Townshend

He married Anne Montgomery, the daughter of Sir William Montgomery, 1st Baronet, on 19 May 1773. Anne was Mistress of the Robes to Caroline, Princess of Wales, from 1795 to 1820. They had six children:
 Lord William Townshend (1778–1794)
 Captain Lord James Nugent Boyle Bernardo Townshend (11 September 178528 June 1842)
 Lady Anne Townshend (1775-1826) 
 Lady Charlotte Townshend (16 March 177630 July 1856), married the 6th Duke of Leeds.
 Lady Honoria Townshend (1777–1826)
 Lady Henrietta Townshend (died 9 November 1848)

References

Sources

Further reading
 Bartlett, Thomas. "Viscount Townshend and the Irish Revenue Board, 1767-73." Proceedings of the Royal Irish Academy, Section C (1979): 153–175. in JSTOR
 Bartlett, T. "Opposition in late eighteenth-century Ireland: the case of the Townshend viceroyalty", Irish Historical Studies 22 (1980–81), 313–30 in JSTOR
 Bartlett, T. "The augmentation of the army in Ireland, 1767–1769" English Historical review 96 (1981), 540–59 in JSTOR

External links
Government House in Fort Townshend in Newfoundland
Guide to the George Townshend, Marquis Townshend, and Charlotte, Lady Townshend Collection 1763-1810 at the University of Chicago Special Collections Research Center

|-

1724 births
1807 deaths
18th-century English nobility
19th-century English nobility
2nd Dragoon Guards (Queen's Bays) officers
Alumni of St John's College, Cambridge
British Army personnel of the Jacobite rising of 1745
British Army personnel of the Seven Years' War
British Army personnel of the War of the Austrian Succession
British field marshals
British Army personnel of the French and Indian War
British MPs 1747–1754
British MPs 1754–1761
British MPs 1761–1768
English duellists
Governors of Jersey
Lord-Lieutenants of Norfolk
Lords Lieutenant of Ireland
01
Members of the Parliament of Great Britain for Norfolk
Members of the Privy Council of Great Britain
Military personnel from London
George Townshend